Zabarella is an Italian surname. Notable people with the surname include:

Alessandro Sanminiatelli Zabarella (1840–1910), Italian cardinal
Francesco Zabarella (1360–1417), Italian cardinal and canonist
Jacopo Zabarella (1532–1589), Italian Aristotelian philosopher and logician

Italian-language surnames